Samajbadi Party, Nepal may refer to:

 Communist Party of Nepal (Unified Socialist), splinter party of Communist Party of Nepal (Unified Marxist–Leninist) commonly referred to as Unified Socialist, Socialist Party or Samajbadi Party
 Samajbadi Party, Nepal (2019)
 Socialist Party of Nepal led by Dr. Baburam Bhattarai